That Empty Feeling is a 2015 crime fiction novel by Australian writer Peter Corris. It is the 41st novel in Corris' series of works about Cliff Hardy, a fictional private investigator who lives and works in the inner suburbs of Sydney. The novel is a reminiscence about a case in the 1980s.

References

2015 Australian novels
Australian crime novels
Novels set in Sydney
Allen & Unwin books